Desisella is a species of beetle in the family Cerambycidae. Its only species is Desisella strandiella. It was described by Stephan von Breuning in 1942.

References

Pteropliini
Beetles described in 1942